Lindeniidae is a family of dragonflies occurring in Australia.

The family Lindeniidae is not recognised in the World Odonata List at the Slater Museum of Natural History, but rather its species are considered to be part of the Gomphidae family.

Genera
The family includes the following genera:

 †Burmalindenia Schädel and Bechly 2016 Burmese amber, Cenomanian
†Cratolindenia Bechly 2000 Crato Formation, Brazil, Aptian
Ictinogomphus

References

 
Odonata families
Odonata of Asia
Odonata of Africa
Odonata of Australia
Taxa named by Georgiy Jacobson
Taxa named by Valentin Lvovich Bianchi
Insects described in 1905